Sia Saran-e Olya (also Romanized as Sīā Sarān-e ‘Olyā; also known as Seyāh Sarān-e ‘Olyā, Sīāh Sara, and Sīā Sarān-e Bālā) is a village in Hoseynabad-e Jonubi Rural District, in the Central District of Sanandaj County, Kurdistan Province, Iran. At the 2006 census, its population was 172, in 37 families. The village is populated by Kurds.

References 

Towns and villages in Sanandaj County
Kurdish settlements in Kurdistan Province